Akkada Ammayi Ikkada Abbayi is a 1996 Indian Telugu-language film directed by E. V. V. Satyanarayana. Produced by Allu Aravind under Geeta Arts Banner, the film stars Pawan Kalyan and Supriya in their debuts. The music of the film was by Koti.

The film was the official remake of the 1988 Hindi film Qayamat Se Qayamat Tak. The film marks the debut of Pawan Kalyan, the younger brother of Chiranjeevi, in the Telugu film industry. It is also the debut film appearance of Supriya, the granddaughter of Akkineni Nageswara Rao.

Plot 
Harichandra Prasad and Vishnu Murthy are two rich and powerful rivals in a village. Harichandra Prasad's daughter Supriya and Vishnu Murthy's son Kalyan study in the same college, where they both engage in few fights and bets. Kalyan and his gang attempt to enter a girls hostel and succeeds at last, and he wins a bet with Supriya. Slowly their love blossoms under these petty things and they reach their village, where they are separated at the railway station by their parents. The vacation ends and Kalyan reaches the station to get back to his college, but Supriya does not turn up. Kalyan learns that her marriage is fixed, and gets off the train to reach Supriya's house. But he is thrashed by Harichandra Prasad and his men. Meanwhile, her marriage is postponed due to her grandmother's death. Using this to their advantage, Kalyan and Supriya elope. Her brother and his men become involved in a fight with Kalyan. In the end, Vishnu Murthy saves Harichandra Prasad from being drowned in an abyss, and suddenly everyone realises their mistake and reunite the lovers and get them married.

Cast 

 Pawan Kalyan as Mullapudi Kalyan (credited as Kalyan Babu)
 Supriya Yarlagadda as Supriya
 Nassar as Harichandra Prasad
 Chandra Mohan as Chandra Shekhar
 Sarath Babu as Vishnu Murthy
 Ahuti Prasad as Srihari Rao
 Allu Ramalingaiyah as Principal
 Kota Srinivasa Rao as Suleman
 Brahmanandam as Pilaka Govinda Sastry
 Babu Mohan as Peter
 Mallikarjuna Rao as Esupadam
 AVS as S.I.
 Gokina Rama Rao
 Raja Ravindra as Raja
 Garimalla Visweswara Rao
 Tirupathi Prakash
 Ironleg Sastri as Pilaka Gajapada Sastry
 Ashok Kumar
 Kavitha as Rajeswari
 Sudha as Lakshmi
 Attili Lakshmi
 Kovai Sarala as Julie
 Kalpana Rai as Nookalamma
 Madhu as rowdy
 Ooha as Shanti (Cameo appearance)
 Rambha as item number "Chaligali Jummandi"
 Sunil (Uncredited Cameo)

Soundtrack 
The music is composed by Koti. Lyrics are written by Veturi. The music was released on Lahari Music.

References

External links 
 

1990s Telugu-language films
1996 films
Films based on Romeo and Juliet
Films directed by E. V. V. Satyanarayana
Films scored by Koti
Geetha Arts films
Telugu remakes of Hindi films